Rolbik  is a village in the administrative district of Gmina Brusy, within Chojnice County, Pomeranian Voivodeship, in northern Poland. It is located within the ethnocultural region of Kashubia in the historic region of Pomerania.

The village has a population of 129.

Rolbik was a royal village of the Polish Crown, administratively located in the Tuchola County in the Pomeranian Voivodeship.

Notable people 
Stanisław Pestka (1929–2015) a Kashubian poet

References

Rolbik